Robert Jones (born June 26, 1979) is an American basketball coach, currently the head men's basketball coach at Norfolk State University. He was named interim head coach on April 15, 2013, and was named full head coach in February 2014. He grew up in South Jamaica, Queens, NY. In 2019, he was awarded the Skip Prosser Man of the Year Award.

Coaching career 
Robert Jones is in the midst of his ninth season as the head coach of Norfolk State’s men’s basketball program. NSU’s 9-1 start to the 2021-22 season is the best start in MEAC history and the second best in HBCU history. 

The historic start is coming off of Norfolk State’s second-ever MEAC title and an NCAA Tournament berth, where the Spartans knocked off Appalachian State in the NCAA Tournament First Four. NSU finished the season 17-8. 

Entering the 2021-22 season, Jones has led NSU to a .742 (92-32) win percentage in MEAC play, which is fifth in the nation among coaches with at least 100 games coached. Jones has led Norfolk State to a first or second finish in the MEAC in six of his eight seasons, and has finished No. 1 in league play two of the last three years. 

Among the awards Jones has won include 2020-21 MEAC Tournament Most Outstanding Coach, 2020-21 HBCU Co-Coach of the Year, 2018-19 MEAC Coach of the Year, 2018-19 NABC District 15 Coach of the Year and 2018-19 Skip Prosser Man of the Year.

Under Jones, NSU has set D-I program records for 3-pointers, 3-point field goal attempts, 3-point field goal percentage and largest scoring margin (three times each); fewest turnovers per game, rebounds, rebounds per game, points, field goal attempts and best turnover margin (all twice); and field goals, assists, free throws made and free throw percentage (all once). In 2018-19, NSU averaged 73.7 points per game, the most in program history in 19 years.

Jones was named the interim head coach on April 15, 2013, following Anthony Evans’ departure. In February of 2014 the interim tagged was removed and Jones was named the full time head coach. Jones had been an assistant coach the previous six seasons, including the Associate Head Coach during the 2012-13 season. 

Before landing an assistant coaching position at Norfolk State, Jones was the head varsity boys basketball coach at Manhasset (NY) St. Mary’s, where his teams compiled a 32-15 record in New York’s highest classification (Class AA). As the head coach, Jones sent three players to Division-I institutions. Before landing the head coaching position, Jones was an assistant during the 2004-05 season, and coached 2009 Cleveland Cavaliers draftee Danny Green and former WVU star and LA Lakers Devin Ebanks. 

Before becoming a high school coach, Jones was an assistant at a pair of D-III schools — Bard College and the State University of New York at New Paltz.

Jones was a four-year letterwinner from 1997-2001 at New Paltz. Jones was a three-time All-SUNYAC selection and an honorable mention D-III All-American in 2000. Jones ranks No. 9 all-time in school history in scoring with 1,321 points, first in blocks with 140 and second in rebounds with 875.

Head coaching record

College

References

1979 births
Living people
American men's basketball coaches
American men's basketball players
Bard Raptors men's basketball coaches
Basketball coaches from New York (state)
Basketball players from New York City
College men's basketball head coaches in the United States
New Paltz Hawks men's basketball coaches
New Paltz Hawks men's basketball players
High school basketball coaches in the United States
Norfolk State Spartans men's basketball coaches
Sportspeople from Queens, New York